Anstey railway station is located on the Upfield line in Victoria, Australia. It serves the northern Melbourne suburb of Brunswick, and it opened on 15 December 1926 as North Brunswick. It was renamed Anstey on 1 December 1942.

History

Anstey station opened on 15 December 1926, and was renamed in honour of former State and Federal Member of Parliament, Frank Anstey.

In 1971, the current station platforms were lengthened.

In 2020, the station became a temporary terminus whist level crossing removals occurred at Coburg and Moreland. A temporary crossover was provided at the Up end of the station, to allow trains to terminate and return to Flinders Street.

Announced in September 2022, Anstey, alongside other stations on the Upfield line, will be elevated to remove eight level crossings on the line. Further details, designs and a construction timeline will be released closer to 2027.

Platforms and services

Anstey has two side platforms. It is serviced by Metro Trains' Upfield line services.

Platform 1:
  all stations services to Flinders Street

Platform 2:
  all stations services to Upfield

Transport links

Moonee Valley Coaches operates one route via Anstey station, under contract to Public Transport Victoria:
 : Essendon station – East Brunswick

Yarra Trams operates one route via Anstey station:
 : North Coburg – Flinders Street station (Elizabeth Street CBD)

Gallery

References

External links
 
 Melway map at street-directory.com.au

Railway stations in Melbourne
Railway stations in Australia opened in 1926
Railway stations in the City of Merri-bek